Nathu Singh Gurjar (born 1 January 1951, Dhamsya) is an Indian politician. He was a cabinet minister in Government of Rajasthan led by Vasundhara Raje of Bharatiya Janata Party. He was elected to the Rajasthan Legislative Assembly from Dausa district of Rajasthan. He is a former member of the Lok Sabha and represented Dausa constituency. He studied for B.Sc, LLM and Ph.D.

References 

1951 births
Living people
India MPs 1977–1979
India MPs 1989–1991
People from Dausa district
Lok Sabha members from Rajasthan
Rajasthan MLAs 1993–1998
State cabinet ministers of Rajasthan
Indians imprisoned during the Emergency (India)
University of Rajasthan alumni
Bharatiya Janata Party politicians from Rajasthan
Janata Party politicians